Antonio Álvarez Alonso (11 March 1867 - 22 June 1903) was a Spanish pianist and composer. He is best known for his Pasodoble Suspiros de España.

References

External links
 

1867 births
1903 deaths
Spanish composers
Spanish male composers
19th-century Spanish male musicians